The men's handball competition, one of two events of handball at the 2000 Summer Olympics, in Sydney, took place at The Dome (Sydney Olympic Park) during the preliminary round, quarter-finals, semi-finals and medal matches. A total of 180 players, distributed among twelve national teams, participated in this tournament.

Medalists

Qualification

Squads

Preliminary round
All times are local (UTC+10).

Group A

Group B

Knockout stage

Bracket

Eleventh place game

Ninth place game

Quarterfinals

5–8th place semifinals

Semifinals

Seventh place game

Fifth place game

Bronze medal game

Gold medal game

Rankings and statistics

Final ranking

Top goalscorers

Top goalkeepers
Minimum 20% of total shots received by team

References

External links
Official Report of the XXVIIth Olympiad – Handball

M
Men's events at the 2000 Summer Olympics